Alin Nicolae Chița (born 5 September 1977) is a Romanian former footballer and currently a manager.

Honours
Juventus București
Liga III: 2009–10

External links
 
 

1977 births
Living people
Sportspeople from Pitești
Romanian footballers
Association football defenders
Liga I players
Liga II players
Chinese Super League players
FC Dacia Pitești players
FC Argeș Pitești players
FC UTA Arad players
Tianjin Jinmen Tiger F.C. players
ASC Daco-Getica București players
Al-Faisaly SC players
Romanian expatriate footballers
Romanian expatriate sportspeople in China
Expatriate footballers in China
Romanian expatriate sportspeople in Jordan
Expatriate footballers in Jordan
Romanian football managers
ASC Daco-Getica București managers
CS Național Sebiș managers
FC Metaloglobus București managers
Liga II managers
FC Rapid București assistant managers